Charles Pirie (8 January 1897 – 3 February 1960) was a Scottish chess player.

Biography
Charles Pirie graduated from University of Aberdeen in 1920. He worked as a mathematics teacher all his life.

Charles Pirie took an active part in the work of the Aberdeen chess club Bon-Accord CC. His most notable organizing work is related to the Scottish Chess Championship of 1939, held in Aberdeen.

Charles Pirie played for Scotland in the Chess Olympiad:
 In 1937, at reserve board in the 7th Chess Olympiad in Stockholm (+0, =1, -9).

References

External links

Charles Pirie chess games at 365chess.com

1897 births
1960 deaths
Sportspeople from Aberdeen
Scottish chess players
Chess Olympiad competitors
20th-century chess players
Alumni of the University of Aberdeen